Pickled pigs feet is a type of pork associated with cuisine of the Southern United States, Mexican, Chinese, Italian, and Scandinavian cuisine.

The feet of domestic pigs are typically salted and smoked in the same manner as other pork cuts, such as hams and bacon. It is common to preserve them in a manner very similar to home canning and processes for pickled vegetables; typically a saturation of hot vinegar brine is used. Such methods allow them to be preserved without the need for refrigeration until the jar is opened. They were once popular in American bars.

See also

 List of smoked foods
Offal
Pig's trotters

References

External links
https://library.ndsu.edu/grhc/history_culture/custom_traditions/kholodetz.html

Cuisine of the Southern United States
Mexican cuisine
Pickles
Pig's trotters
Smoked meat
Soul food
African-American cuisine
Offal